Lacumazes was a king of the ancient Numidian tribe Massylii in 206 BCE.

Biography 
He was the youngest son of Oezalces and little brother of Capussa. Although when he was still very young, he was put on the throne of the Massylii by Mazaetullus, a Numidian chieftain who dethroned and after killing Capussa. As soon as Masinissa returned to Africa, Lacumazes fled and took refuge in the court of Syphax to ask for help; but before reaching the destination, he was attacked by Massinissa, and narrowly escaped capture. From Syphax he obtained auxiliary troops, with whom he joined his guardian, Mazaetullus, and faced Massinissa, but both armies were defeated. Lacumazes and Mazaetullus escaped and took refuge in the court of Syphax. Massinissa encouraged him to return and he was received at the Massylii court with all the honors due to his royal blood.

References

External links 

 Livy, The History of Rome, Book 29, chapter 29, Chapter 30

3rd-century BC Berber people
3rd-century BC rulers in Africa